Sherrardswood School is an independent, coeducational school for students aged two to eighteen, located in Welwyn, Hertfordshire, England. The school was founded in 1928 by Ethel Wragg. The current headmistress is Anna Wright. The current Chair of Governors is Ali Khan.

History
In 2014, due to financial difficulties, the headmistress was made to resign and Ali Khan, owner of several for-profit private schools, became the new head of the governors. At some point later, Alpha Schools Ltd, Mr Khan's company, bought Sherrardswood School.

John Clements
John Clements (GC), a schoolmaster at the school, was posthumously awarded the George Cross on 7 December 1976 for actions during a school ski trip that saved the lives of thirty-seven children.

References

External links

1928 establishments in England
Educational institutions established in 1928
Schools in Welwyn Garden City
Welwyn
Private schools in Hertfordshire